Pierce Township is an inactive township in Stone County, in the U.S. state of Missouri.

Pierce Township was erected in 1853.

References

Townships in Missouri
Townships in Stone County, Missouri